Hiiu County ( or Hiiumaa) is one of 15 counties of Estonia, being the smallest county both in terms of area and population. It consists of Hiiumaa (German and ), the second largest island of Estonia, and several smaller islands near it. The county borders Lääne County to the east and Saare County to the south.

History 
Human habitation of Hiiumaa can be traced back to the fifth millennium BC. Mesolithic sites in Kõpu peninsula are exemplified by the seal-hunters' settlements. There are several well-preserved grave fields of the Iron Age. In 1228, the island was first mentioned in written annals under the name Dageida. In 1254, Hiiumaa was divided between the Livonian Order and the Bishopric of Ösel-Wiek. In 1563 Hiiumaa was annexed into Sweden. In 1710, as a result of the Great Northern War the island went under the control of the Russian Empire. During World War I, the German military forces occupied Hiiumaa in 1917. In 1918–1940 Hiiumaa was part of the Republic of Estonia, then until 1991 occupied by the Soviet Union.

On demands of the Hanseatic League a lighthouse was built in Kõpu (previously known as Dagerort) at the beginning of the 16th century.

Most of the farm architecture comes from the 19th century. Prominent examples include the Mihkli farming complex and Soera farm-museum with historical national artifacts, respectively.

Sights 
Most important sights:
 Suuremõisa manor
 Kõpu Lighthouse and ancient graves
 Suursadam port
 Tahkuna Lighthouse and associated coastal defenses
 Ristna Lighthouse
 Sääretirp
 Saarnaki laid and other isles
 Kärdla town
 Käina church ruins
 
 Reigi church
 Kärdla meteorite crater
 Kassari chapel, Kassari

County government 
The County Government was led by Governor, who is appointed by the Government of Estonia for a term of five years. The last Governor was Riho Rahuoja 2012−2017.

Religion

Municipalities 

The county consists of one municipality after the administrative reform of 2017. Between 2013 and 2017 the county was subdivided into 4 municipalities ( – parishes). The only urban settlement Kärdla is part of Hiiumaa Parish since 2017.

Rural municipalities:
 Hiiumaa Parish (includes the town of Kärdla)

Geography 
The county includes the islands of Hiiumaa and Kassari and a number of surrounding islets. The highest point is Tornimägi hill, the longest river is Luguse, and the biggest lake is Tihu Suurjärv.

In the landscapes there can be found pine forests, mixed spruce and deciduous forests, swampy thickets and juniper shrubs, coastal meadows and bogs. The most frequent tree is pine which makes about a half of forests. Pine is followed by birch, spruce and alder. In total, there are about 1,000 species of vascular plants, of which about 100 are under protection. The wildlife of Hiiumaa is remarkable. Out of 30 species of mammals, big game as elk, deer, fox, wild boar and lynx roam the island. There are about 250 species of birds on the island, 195 of them nesting.

Among the Estonian counties Hiiumaa is the richest in forest – nearly 60% of the island are wooded areas. There are large marsh areas in the middle of the island. The marshes cover about 7% of its area. Cultivated land and settlements take about 23% of the area of the county.

Gallery

References

External links

Lääne-Viru County Government – Official website
Lääne-Virumaa County Infoserver – map and tourism info

 
Counties of Estonia